Store in a Cool Place is an album by the New Zealand band Able Tasmans, released in 1995.

Critical reception

Trouser Press wrote that "if you can get past the excess baggage ... the remaining tunes are among the quintet's best, with [Peter] Keen characteristically burying a few of his sharpest emotional daggers amidst some of the more outwardly placid tracks." Entertainment Weekly stated: "What could have been derivative is, instead, a glorious sonic whirlwind—one of the most bewitching rock albums of the year." The Dominion opined that "a lot of the songs are disappointing and heavy with a circus-like atmosphere."

Track listing
"That's Why"
"Giant"
"Simple"
"The Professional"
"My Name is Peter Keen"
"GG 300"
"The Wind Changed"
"Dog Whelk 2"
"Orenthal's Face"
"Ladies & Gentlemen"
"Mary Tyler Moore"
"Home on the Range"
"The Klingon National Anthem"
"Parallax"

References

1995 albums
Able Tasmans albums
Flying Nun Records albums